Yuen Tze Lo (January 31, 1920 – May 10, 2002) was a Chinese American electrical engineer and academician. He was a professor emeritus at the Department of Electrical and Computer Engineering at University of Illinois at Urbana–Champaign. He is best known for his contributions to the theory and design of antennas. He is the editor of the textbook series, Antenna Handbook.

The Yuen T. Lo Outstanding Research Award at University of Illinois at Urbana–Champaign is named after him.

Biography
Lo was born on January 31, 1920, in Hankou, Republic of China. He received his bachelor's degree in electrical engineering from National Southwestern Associated University in 1942. Between 1946 and 1948, he worked at the National Tsing Hua University in Kunming as an instructor; he worked briefly at the Yenching University as well. He obtained his M.S. and PhD degrees in electrical engineering from University of Illinois at Urbana in 1949 and 1952, respectively.

Between 1952 and 1956, Lo worked at Channel Master Corporation at Ellenville, New York, as an engineer. In 1956, Lo joined University of Illinois at Urbana–Champaign as faculty member, conducting research at the Antenna Laboratory. Lo stayed as faculty member at University of Illinois until his retirement in 1990. He was also the director of the Electromagnetics Lab from 1982 to 1990.

Lo had served as a distinguished lecturer in microstrip antenna theory. In 1986, Lo was elected to the National Academy of Engineering, "for inventions and innovative ideas which have advanced significantly the theory and design of antennas and arrays." In 1996, he received IEEE Antennas & Propagation Society's Distinguished Achievement Award for "fundamental contributions to the theory of antenna arrays."

Lo was married to Sara de Mundo and had two children. He died on May 10, 2002.

Research
Lo's research interests included antenna theory, design and applications. He is regarded as the inventor of the broadband television-receiving antenna. In 1959, he designed the University of Illinois's radio telescope, Vermilion Observatory Radio Telescope; the structure was considered to be the largest antenna of the world at that time, prior to the completion of Arecibo Telescope. In the late 1970s, he introduced the cavity-model theory for microstrip-patch antennas. His research work and expertise also involved other microwave structures such as microwave resonators and artificial materials.

In 1958, Lo introduced an early version of method of moments in a course on electromagnetics at University of Illinois.

Selected publications
Articles
 
 
 
 
 
 
 
 

Books

Book chapters

References

1920 births
2002 deaths
People from Wuhan
Republic of China (1912–1949) emigrants to the United States
American electrical engineers
American telecommunications engineers
Microwave engineers
National Southwestern Associated University alumni
Academic staff of the National Tsing Hua University
Grainger College of Engineering alumni
University of Illinois Urbana-Champaign faculty
Electrical engineering academics
American academics of Chinese descent
American engineering writers
20th-century American engineers
20th-century Chinese engineers
Chinese electrical engineers
Members of the United States National Academy of Engineering
Fellow Members of the IEEE
American educators of Asian descent
Scientists from Hubei
20th-century American inventors
20th-century Chinese inventors
American textbook writers